Darrick Brown (born February 18, 1984) is a former indoor football cornerback. He last played for the Allen Wranglers of the Indoor Football League. He also played for the New Orleans VooDoo of the Arena Football League and the Oakland Raiders as an undrafted free agent in 2008. He played college football at McNeese State.

Brown was also a member of the New Orleans Saints and the Indianapolis Colts.

External links
McNeese State Cowboys bio
New Orleans Saints bio

1984 births
Living people
Players of American football from Louisiana
American football wide receivers
American football cornerbacks
American football safeties
McNeese Cowboys football players
Oakland Raiders players
New Orleans Saints players
Indianapolis Colts players
Allen Wranglers players
New Orleans VooDoo players
People from Tangipahoa Parish, Louisiana